Christian democracy is a political ideology that seeks to apply Christian principles to public policy. It is also the name of several political parties:

Italy
Christian Democracy (Italy), 1943–1994
Rebirth of Christian Democracy, 1997–2012
Christian Democratic Party (Italy), 2000–2013
Christian Democracy (Italy, 2002), 2002–present
Christian Democracy (Italy, 2004), 2004–present
Christian Democracy for the Autonomies, 2005–2009
Christian Democracy (Italy, 2012), 2012–present

Other countries
Christian Democracy (Poland)
Christian Democracy (Greece)
Christian Democracy (Brazil)